Kurthwood is an unincorporated community in Vernon Parish, Louisiana, United States. Its ZIP code is 71443.

Notes

Unincorporated communities in Vernon Parish, Louisiana
Unincorporated communities in Louisiana